Jennifer Diachun (born 14 August 1953) is a Canadian gymnast. She competed at the 1968 Summer Olympics and the 1972 Summer Olympics.

References

1953 births
Living people
Canadian female artistic gymnasts
Olympic gymnasts of Canada
Gymnasts at the 1968 Summer Olympics
Gymnasts at the 1972 Summer Olympics
Gymnasts from Toronto
Pan American Games medalists in gymnastics
Pan American Games bronze medalists for Canada
Gymnasts at the 1971 Pan American Games
20th-century Canadian women
21st-century Canadian women